Yoko Ono/Plastic Ono Band is the debut solo studio album by Japanese artist and musician Yoko Ono, released on Apple Records in December 1970 alongside her husband's album John Lennon/Plastic Ono Band. Ono's album features her vocal improvisations against backing by the Plastic Ono Band (consisting of John Lennon on guitar, Ringo Starr on drums, and Klaus Voormann on bass), with the exception of the track "AOS", which is backed by the Ornette Coleman Quartet. 

In the United States, the album peaked at number 182 on the Billboard Top LPs chart. It received negative criticism upon release, with the exception of supportive reviews by Billboard and critic Lester Bangs of Rolling Stone. Despite its lack of commercial success, it has been depicted as an influential recording for a variety of subsequent musicians.

Recording
With the exception of "AOS", a 1968 recording, Ono's album was recorded at Abbey Road Studios during the same September–October 1970 sessions that produced the John Lennon/Plastic Ono Band album. Also recorded at this time was "Between the Takes", which was released on the 1998 CD reissue of Ono's Fly album. "Greenfield Morning I Pushed an Empty Baby Carriage All Over the City" was based on a sample from a tape of George Harrison playing sitar and a Ringo Starr drum break with an added echo effect plus Ono's vocals with a lyric referencing a miscarriage. Ono's vocalisations on tracks such as "Why" and "Why Not" mixed hetai, a Japanese vocal technique from kabuki theatre, with modern rock 'n roll and raw aggression influenced by the then-popular primal therapy that Lennon and Ono had been undertaking. According to Ono, the recording engineers were in the habit of turning off the recording equipment when she began to perform – which is why, at the end of "Why", Lennon can be heard asking "Were you gettin' that?"

On 29 February 1968, Ono appeared onstage at London's Royal Albert Hall with Ornette Coleman and his jazz group. The performance and their afternoon rehearsal were both recorded; "AOS" was recorded during this rehearsal and included on the album, the only track not featuring the Plastic Ono Band as it existed for the December Ono and Lennon albums. Describing how she met Coleman, Ono has stated:Ornette was already very, very established and famous and respected guy as a musician. And I met him in Paris. The way I met was, I was doing a show and after the show, somebody said, Oh, Ornette Coleman is here and he would like to – okay. Well, hello. Thank you for coming. That kind of thing. And he was saying, Well, okay. So he said that he was going to go and do a concert in Albert Hall and would I come and do it with him because he thought it was kind of interesting what I do.

Release and reception

Initially on Apple Records, through EMI, Yoko Ono/Plastic Ono Band was released to considerable critical disdain in 1970, at a time when Ono was being widely blamed for disbanding The Beatles. Yoko Ono/Plastic Ono Band only hit the lower reaches of the album chart in the United States, failing to chart in the United Kingdom altogether. Notable exceptions were the estimations of Billboard, which called it "visionary," and Rolling Stone critic Lester Bangs, who called it "the first J&Y album that doesn’t insult the intelligence—in fact, in its dark confounding way, it’s nearly as beautiful as John’s album… There’s something happening here." More recently, the album has been credited with having an influence on musicians grossly disproportionate to its sales and visibility, akin to that of The Velvet Underground. David Browne of Entertainment Weekly has credited the album with "launching a hundred or more female alternative rockers, like Kate Pierson & Cindy Wilson of the B-52s to current thrashers like L7 and Courtney Love of Hole".

The covers of Yoko Ono/Plastic Ono Band and John Lennon/Plastic Ono Band albums are nearly identical. Lennon pointed out the difference in their 1980 Playboy interview: "in Yoko's, she's leaning back on me; in mine, I'm leaning on her". The photos were taken with a cheap Instamatic camera on the grounds of Tittenhurst Park (their home at the time) by actor Daniel Richter, who is best known for playing Moon-Watcher, the head apeman in the 1968 science fiction film 2001: A Space Odyssey by Stanley Kubrick. At the time, Richter lived with Lennon and Ono and worked as their assistant.

The album was reissued on compact disc by Rykodisc in 1997 with three bonus tracks from the era. An "LP replica" special edition was issued by V2 Records in Japan in 2007, and it was reissued again on LP, compact disc, and digital download by Secretly Canadian on November 11, 2016, with bonus tracks and rare photos.

The title and lyrics to "Greenfield Morning" derive from Ono's 1964 book Grapefruit. An edited version of "Open Your Box" appeared as the B-side to the UK issue of Lennon's single "Power to the People".

Track listing
All songs written by Yoko Ono.

Original release
Side one
"Why" – 5:37
"Why Not" – 9:55
"Greenfield Morning I Pushed an Empty Baby Carriage All Over the City" – 5:38

Side two
"AOS" – 7:06
"Touch Me" – 4:37
"Paper Shoes" – 7:26

1997 reissue
Tracks 1–6 per the 1970 release, with the following bonus tracks:
"Open Your Box" (alternate version) – 7:35
"Something More Abstract" – 0:44
"The South Wind" – 16:38

2016 reissue
Tracks 1–6 per the 1970 release, with the following bonus tracks:
"Open Your Box" (alternate version) – 7:35
"Something More Abstract" – 0:44
"Why" (extended version) – 8:41
"The South Wind" – 16:38

Personnel
 Yoko Ono – vocals
 John Lennon – guitars
 Klaus Voormann – bass guitar
 Ringo Starr – drums
 George Harrison – sitar on "Greenfield Morning I Pushed an Empty Baby Carriage All Over the City"
 Ornette Coleman – trumpet on "AOS"
 Charlie Haden – double bass on "AOS"
 David Izenzon – double bass on "AOS"
 Ed Blackwell – drums on "AOS"

Technical personnel
 Phil McDonald – engineering
 John Leckie – engineering
 Andy Stevens – engineering
 "Eddie" – engineering

Charts

Release history

References

External links

Yoko Ono albums
1970 debut albums
Apple Records albums
Albums produced by John Lennon
Albums produced by Yoko Ono
Musique concrète albums
Plastic Ono Band albums